

Events

Pre-1600
1312 BC – Mursili II launches a campaign against the Kingdom of Azzi-Hayasa.
 474 – Julius Nepos forces Roman usurper Glycerius to abdicate the throne and proclaims himself Emperor of the Western Roman Empire.
 637 – The Battle of Moira is fought between the High King of Ireland and the Kings of Ulster and Dál Riata. It is claimed to be the largest battle in the history of Ireland.
 843 – The Vikings sack the French city of Nantes. 
 972 – Battle of Cedynia, the first documented victory of Polish forces, takes place.
1128 – Battle of São Mamede, near Guimarães: Forces led by Afonso I defeat forces led by his mother Teresa of León and her lover Fernando Pérez de Traba.
1230 – The Siege of Jaén begins, in the context of the Spanish Reconquista.
1314 – First War of Scottish Independence: The Battle of Bannockburn concludes with a decisive victory by Scottish forces led by Robert the Bruce.
1340 – Hundred Years' War: Battle of Sluys: The French fleet is almost completely destroyed by the English fleet commanded in person by King Edward III.
1374 – A sudden outbreak of St. John's Dance causes people in the streets of Aachen, Germany, to experience hallucinations and begin to jump and twitch uncontrollably until they collapse from exhaustion.
1497 – John Cabot lands in North America at Newfoundland leading the first European exploration of the region since the Vikings.
1509 – Henry VIII and Catherine of Aragon are crowned King and Queen of England.
1535 – The Anabaptist state of Münster is conquered and disbanded.
1540 – English King Henry VIII commands his fourth wife, Anne of Cleves, to leave the court.
1571 – Miguel López de Legazpi founds Manila, the capital of the Philippines.
1593 – The Dutch city of Geertruidenberg held by the Spanish, capitulates to a besieging Dutch and English army led by Maurice of Nassau.

1601–1900
1604 – Samuel de Champlain discovers the mouth of the Saint John River, site of Reversing Falls and the present-day city of Saint John, New Brunswick, Canada.
1622 – Battle of Macau: The Dutch make a failed attempt to capture Macau.
1663 – The Spanish garrison of Évora capitulates, following the Portuguese victory at the Battle of Ameixial. 
1717 – The Premier Grand Lodge of England is founded in London, the first Masonic Grand Lodge in the world (now the United Grand Lodge of England).
1762 – Battle of Wilhelmsthal: The British-Hanoverian army of Ferdinand of Brunswick defeats French forces in Westphalia.
1779 – American Revolutionary War: The Great Siege of Gibraltar begins.
1793 – The first Republican constitution in France is adopted.
1812 – Napoleonic Wars: Napoleon's Grande Armée crosses the Neman river beginning the invasion of Russia.
1813 – Battle of Beaver Dams: A British and Indian combined force defeats the United States Army.
1821 – Battle of Carabobo: Decisive battle in the war of independence of Venezuela from Spain.
1859 – Battle of Solferino (Battle of the Three Sovereigns): Sardinia and France defeat Austria in Solferino, northern Italy.
1866 – Battle of Custoza: An Austrian army defeats the Italian army during the Austro-Prussian War.
1880 – First performance of O Canada at the Congrès national des Canadiens-Français. The song would later become the national anthem of Canada.
1894 – Marie François Sadi Carnot, President of France, is assassinated by Sante Geronimo Caserio.

1901–present
1913 – Greece and Serbia annul their alliance with Bulgaria.
1916 – Mary Pickford becomes the first female film star to sign a million-dollar contract.
1918 – First airmail service in Canada from Montreal to Toronto.
1922 – The American Professional Football Association is renamed the National Football League.
1932 – A bloodless revolution instigated by the People's Party ends the absolute power of King Prajadhipok of Siam (now Thailand).
1938 – Pieces of a meteorite land near Chicora, Pennsylvania. The meteorite is estimated to have weighed 450 metric tons when it hit the Earth's atmosphere and exploded.
1939 – Siam is renamed Thailand by Plaek Phibunsongkhram, the country's third prime minister.
1940 – World War II: Operation Collar, the first British Commando raid on occupied France, by No 11 Independent Company.
1943 – US military police attempt to arrest a black soldier in Bamber Bridge, England, sparking the Battle of Bamber Bridge mutiny that leaves one dead and seven wounded.
1947 – Kenneth Arnold makes the first widely reported UFO sighting near Mount Rainier, Washington.
1948 – Cold War: Start of the Berlin Blockade: The Soviet Union makes overland travel between West Germany and West Berlin impossible.
1949 – The first television western, Hopalong Cassidy, starring William Boyd, is aired on NBC.
1950 – Apartheid: In South Africa, the Group Areas Act is passed, formally segregating races.
1954 – First Indochina War: Battle of Mang Yang Pass: Viet Minh troops belonging to the 803rd Regiment ambush G.M. 100 of France in An Khê.
1957 – In Roth v. United States, the U.S. Supreme Court rules that obscenity is not protected by the First Amendment.
1960 – Assassination attempt of Venezuelan President Rómulo Betancourt.
1963 – The United Kingdom grants Zanzibar internal self-government.
1973 – The UpStairs Lounge arson attack takes place at a gay bar located on the second floor of the three-story building at 141 Chartres Street in the French Quarter of New Orleans, Louisiana, USA. Thirty-two people die as a result of fire or smoke inhalation.
1975 – Eastern Air Lines Flight 66 encounters severe wind shear and crashes on final approach to New York's JFK Airport killing 113 of the 124 passengers on board, making it the deadliest U.S. plane crash at the time. This accident led to decades of research into downburst and microburst phenomena and their effects on aircraft.
1981 – The Humber Bridge opens to traffic, connecting Yorkshire and Lincolnshire. It remained the world's longest bridge span for 17 years.
1982 – "The Jakarta Incident": British Airways Flight 009 flies into a cloud of volcanic ash thrown up by the eruption of Mount Galunggung, resulting in the failure of all four engines.
1989 – Jiang Zemin succeeds Zhao Ziyang to become the General Secretary of the Chinese Communist Party after the 1989 Tiananmen Square protests and massacre.
1994 – A Boeing B-52 Stratofortress crashes at Fairchild Air Force Base near Spokane, Washington, killing four.
1995 – Rugby World Cup: South Africa defeats New Zealand and Nelson Mandela presents Francois Pienaar with the Webb Ellis Cup in an iconic post-apartheid moment.
2002 – The Igandu train disaster in Tanzania kills 281, the worst train accident in African history.
2004 – In New York, capital punishment is declared unconstitutional.
2010 – At Wimbledon, John Isner of the United States defeats Nicolas Mahut of France, in the longest match in professional tennis history.
  2010   – Julia Gillard assumes office as the first female Prime Minister of Australia.
2012 – Death of Lonesome George, the last known individual of Chelonoidis nigra abingdonii, a subspecies of the Galápagos tortoise.
2013 – Former Italian Prime Minister Silvio Berlusconi is found guilty of abusing his power and engaging in sex with an underage prostitute, and is sentenced to seven years in prison.
2021 – The Champlain Towers South condominium in Surfside, Florida suffers a sudden partial collapse, killing 98 people inside.
2022 – In Dobbs v. Jackson Women's Health Organization, the U.S. Supreme Court rules that a pregnant woman's liberty to choose to have an abortion is not protected by the U.S. Constitution, overturning the court's prior decisions in Roe v. Wade (1973) and Planned Parenthood v. Casey (1992).

Births

Pre-1600
1210 – Count Floris IV of Holland (d. 1234)
1244 – Henry I, Landgrave of Hesse (d. 1308)
1254 – Floris V, Count of Holland (d. 1296)
1257 – Robert de Vere, 6th Earl of Oxford, English nobleman (probable; d. 1331)
1314 – Philippa of Hainault Queen of England (d. 1369)
1322 – Joanna, Duchess of Brabant (d. 1406)
1343 – Joan of Valois, Queen of Navarre (d. 1373)
1360 – Nuno Álvares Pereira, Portuguese general
1386 – John of Capistrano, Italian priest and saint (d. 1456)
1465 – Isabella del Balzo, Queen Consort of Naples (d. 1533)
1485 – Johannes Bugenhagen, Polish-German priest and reformer (d. 1558)
  1485   – Elizabeth of Denmark, Electress of Brandenburg (d. 1555)
1499 – Johannes Brenz, German theologian and the Protestant Reformer (d. 1570)
1519 – Theodore Beza, French theologian and scholar (d. 1605)
1532 – Robert Dudley, 1st Earl of Leicester, English politician (d. 1588)
  1532   – William IV, Landgrave of Hesse-Kassel (d. 1573)
1535 – Joanna of Austria, Princess of Portugal (d. 1573)
1546 – Robert Persons, English Jesuit priest, insurrectionist, and author (d. 1610)
1587 – William Arnold, English-American settler (d. 1675)

1601–1900
1614 – John Belasyse, 1st Baron Belasyse 
1616 – Ferdinand Bol, Dutch painter, etcher and draftsman, student of Rembrandt (d. 1680)
1661 – Hachisuka Tsunanori, Japanese daimyō (d. 1730)
1663 – Jean Baptiste Massillon, French bishop (d. 1742)
1687 – Johann Albrecht Bengel, German-Lutheran clergyman and scholar (d. 1757)
1694 – Jean-Jacques Burlamaqui, Swiss author and theorist (d. 1748)
1704 – Jean-Baptiste de Boyer, Marquis d'Argens, French philosopher and author (d. 1771)
1753 – William Hull, American general and politician, 1st Governor of Michigan Territory (d. 1825)
1755 – Anacharsis Cloots, Prussian-French activist (d. 1794)
1767 – Jean-Baptiste Benoît Eyriès, French geographer and author (d. 1846)
1771 – Éleuthère Irénée du Pont, French chemist and businessman, founded DuPont (d. 1834)
1774 – Antonio González de Balcarce, Argentinian commander and politician, 5th Supreme Director of the United Provinces of the Río de la Plata (d. 1819)
  1774   – François-Nicolas-Benoît Haxo, French general and engineer (d. 1838)
1777 – John Ross, Scottish commander and explorer (d. 1856)
1782 – Juan Larrea, Argentinian captain and politician (d. 1847)
1783 – Johann Heinrich von Thünen, German economist and geographer (d. 1850)
1784 – Juan Antonio Lavalleja, Uruguayan general and politician, President of Uruguay (d. 1853)
1788 – Thomas Blanchard, American inventor (d. 1864)
1795 – Ernst Heinrich Weber, German physician and psychologist (d. 1878)
1797 – John Hughes, Irish-American archbishop (d. 1864)
  1797   – Paweł Edmund Strzelecki, Polish geologist and explorer (d. 1873)
1804 – Stephan Endlicher,  Austrian botanist, numismatist, and sinologist (d. 1849)
  1804   – Willard Richards, American religious leader (d. 1854)
1811 – John Archibald Campbell, American lawyer and jurist (d. 1889)
1813 – Henry Ward Beecher, American minister and reformer (d. 1887)
  1813   – Francis Boott, American composer (d. 1904)
1821 – Guillermo Rawson, Argentinian physician and politician (d. 1890)
1826 – George Goyder, English-Australian surveyor (d. 1898)
1835 – Johannes Wislicenus, German chemist and academic (d. 1902)
1838 – Jan Matejko, Polish painter (d. 1893)
1839 – Gustavus Franklin Swift, American businessman (d. 1903)
1842 – Ambrose Bierce, American short story writer, essayist, and journalist (d. 1914)
1846 – Samuel Johnson, Nigerian priest and historian (d. 1901)
1850 – Herbert Kitchener, 1st Earl Kitchener, Irish field marshal and politician, Governor-General of Sudan (d. 1916)
1852 – Friedrich Loeffler, German bacteriologist and academic (d. 1915)
1854 – Eleanor Norcross, American painter (d. 1923)
1856 – Henry Chapman Mercer, American archaeologist and author (d. 1930)
1858 – Hastings Rashdall, English historian, philosopher, and theologian (d. 1924)
1865 – Robert Henri, American painter and educator (d. 1929)
1867 – Ruth Randall Edström, American educator and activist (d. 1944)
1869 – Prince George of Greece and Denmark (d. 1957)
1872 – Frank Crowninshield, American journalist and art and theatre critic (d. 1947)
1875 – Forrest Reid, Irish novelist, literary critic and translator (d. 1947)
1880 – Oswald Veblen, American mathematician and academic (g. 1960)
  1880   – João Cândido Felisberto, Brazilian revolutionary and sailor (d. 1969)
1881 – George Shiels, Irish-Canadian author, poet, and playwright (d. 1949)
1882 – Athanase David, Canadian lawyer and politician (d. 1953)
  1882   – Carl Diem, German businessman (d. 1962)
1883 – Victor Francis Hess, Austrian-American physicist and academic, Nobel Prize laureate (d. 1964)
  1883   – Fritz Löhner-Beda, Austrian librettist, lyricist and writer (d.1942)
  1883   – Jean Metzinger, French artist (d. 1956)
  1883   – Arthur L. Newton, American runner (d. 1956)
  1883   – Frank Verner, American runner (d. 1966)
1884 – Frank Waller, American runner (d. 1941)
1885 – Olaf Holtedahl, Norwegian geologist (d. 1975)
1888 – Gerrit Rietveld, Dutch architect, designed the Rietveld Schröder House (d. 1964)
1893 – Roy O. Disney, American businessman, co-founded The Walt Disney Company (d. 1971)
1895 – Jack Dempsey, American boxer and soldier (d. 1983)
1898 – Armin Öpik, Estonian-Australian paleontologist and geologist (d. 1983)
  1898   – Karl Selter, Estonian politician, 14th Minister of Foreign Affairs of Estonia (d. 1958)
1900 – Wilhelm Cauer, German mathematician and engineer (d. 1945)

1901–present
1901 – Marcel Mule, French saxophonist (d. 2001)
  1901   – Harry Partch, American composer and theorist (d. 1974)
  1901   – Chuck Taylor, American basketball player and salesman (d. 1969)
1904 – Phil Harris, American singer-songwriter and actor (d. 1995)
1905 – Fred Alderman, American sprinter (d. 1998)
1906 – Pierre Fournier, French cellist and educator (d. 1986)
  1906   – Willard Maas, American poet and educator (d. 1971)
1907 – Arseny Tarkovsky, Russian poet and translator (d. 1989)
1908 – Hugo Distler, German organist, composer, and conductor (d. 1942)
  1908   – Alfons Rebane, Estonian colonel (d. 1976)
1909 – Jean Deslauriers, Canadian violinist, composer, and conductor (d. 1978)
  1909   – William Penney, Baron Penney, English mathematician and physicist (d. 1991)
  1909   – Betty Cavanna, American author (d. 2001) 
1911 – Juan Manuel Fangio, Argentinian race car driver (d. 1995)
  1911   – Ernesto Sabato, Argentinian physicist and academic (d. 2011)
  1911   – Portia White, Canadian opera singer (d. 1968)
1912 – Brian Johnston, English sportscaster and author (d. 1994)
  1912   – Mary Wesley, English author (d. 2002)
1913 – Gustaaf Deloor, Belgian cyclist and soldier (d. 2002)
1914 – Jan Karski, Polish-American activist and academic (d. 2000)
  1914   – Pearl Witherington, French secret agent (d. 2008)
1915 – Fred Hoyle, English astronomer and author (d. 2001)
1916 – William B. Saxbe, American soldier, lawyer, and politician, 70th United States Attorney General (d. 2010)
  1916   – Saloua Raouda Choucair, Lebanese painter and sculptor (d. 2017)
1917 – David Easton, Canadian-American political scientist and academic (d. 2014)
  1917   – Lucy Jarvis, American television producer (d. 2020)
  1917   – Ramblin' Tommy Scott, American singer and guitarist (d. 2013)
  1917   – Joan Clarke, English cryptanalyst and numismatist (d. 1996)
1918 – Mildred Ladner Thompson, American journalist and author (d. 2013)
  1918   – Yong Nyuk Lin, Singaporean businessman and politician, Singaporean Minister for Education (d. 2012)
1919 – Al Molinaro, American actor (d. 2015)
1921 – Gerhard Sommer, German soldier (d. 2019)
1922 – Jack Carter, American actor and comedian (d. 2015)
  1922   – John Postgate, English microbiologist, author, and academic (d. 2014)
  1922   – Richard Timberlake, American economist (d.2020)
1923 – Margaret Olley, Australian painter and philanthropist (d. 2011)
1924 – Kurt Furgler, Swiss politician, 70th President of the Swiss Confederation (d. 2008)
  1924   – Archie Roy, Scottish astronomer and academic (d. 2012)
  1924   – Yoshito Takamine, American politician (d. 2015)
1925 – Ogden Reid, American politician (d. 2019)
1927 – Fernand Dumont, Canadian sociologist, philosopher, and poet (d. 1997)
  1927   – James B. Edwards, American dentist, soldier, and politician, 3rd United States Secretary of Energy (d. 2014)
  1927   – Martin Lewis Perl, American physicist and engineer, Nobel Prize laureate (d. 2014)
1929 – Carolyn S. Shoemaker, American astronomer (d. 2021)
1930 – Claude Chabrol, French actor, director, producer, and screenwriter (d. 2010)
  1930   – Donald Gordon, South African businessman and philanthropist (d. 2019)
  1930   – William Bernard Ziff, Jr., American publisher (d. 2006)
1931 – Billy Casper, American golfer (d. 2015)
1932 – David McTaggart, Canadian-Italian environmentalist (d. 2001)
1933 – Sam Jones, American basketball player and coach (d. 2021)
  1933   – Ngina Kenyatta, 1st First Lady of Kenya
1934 – Ferdinand Biwersi, German footballer and referee (d. 2013)
  1934   – Jean-Pierre Ferland, Canadian singer-songwriter
  1934   – Gloria Christian, Italian singer
1935 – Terry Riley, American composer and educator
  1935   – Jean Milesi, French racing cyclist
  1935   – Charlie Dees, American baseball player
1936 – Robert Downey Sr., American actor and director (d. 2021)
1937 – Anita Desai, Indian-American author and academic
1938 – Lawrence Block, American author
  1938   – Abulfaz Elchibey, Azerbaijani politician, 1st democratically elected Azerbaijani president (d. 2000)
  1938   – Ken Gray, New Zealand rugby player (d. 1992)
1939 – Brigitte Fontaine, French singer
1940 – Ian Ross, Australian newsreader (d. 2014)
  1940   – Vittorio Storaro, Italian cinematographer
1941 – Erkin Koray, Turkish singer-songwriter and guitarist
  1941   – Julia Kristeva, Bulgarian-French psychoanalyst and author
  1941   – Graham McKenzie, Australian cricketer
1942 – Arthur Brown, English rock singer-songwriter
  1942   – Michele Lee, American actress and singer
  1942   – Eduardo Frei Ruiz-Tagle, Chilean engineer and politician, 32nd President of Chile
  1942   – Colin Groves, Australian academician and educator  (d. 2017)
1943 – Birgit Grodal, Danish economist and academic (d. 2004)
1944 – Jeff Beck, English guitarist and songwriter (d. 2023)
  1944   – Kathryn Lasky, American author
  1944   – Chris Wood, English saxophonist (d. 1983)
1945 – Colin Blunstone, English singer-songwriter 
  1945   – Wayne Cashman, Canadian ice hockey player and coach
  1945   – George Pataki, American lawyer and politician, 53rd Governor of New York
  1945   – Betty Stöve, Dutch tennis player
1946 – David Collenette, Canadian civil servant and politician, 32nd Canadian Minister of National Defence
  1946   – Ellison Onizuka, American engineer, and astronaut (d. 1986)
  1946   – Robert Reich, American economist and politician, 22nd United States Secretary of Labor
1947 – Clarissa Dickson Wright, English chef, author, and television personality (d. 2014)
  1947   – Mick Fleetwood, English-American drummer
  1947   – Peter Weller, American actor and director
1948 – Patrick Moraz, Swiss keyboard player and songwriter 
1949 – John Illsley, English singer-songwriter, bass player, and producer 
  1949   – Betty Jackson, English fashion designer
1950 – Nancy Allen, American actress
  1950   – Bob Carlos Clarke, Irish-born English photographer (d. 2006)
  1950   – Jan Kulczyk, Polish businessman (d. 2015)
  1950   – Mercedes Lackey, American author
1951 – Raelene Boyle, Australian sprinter
  1951   – Charles Sturridge, English director, producer, and screenwriter
1952 – Dianna Melrose, English diplomat, British High Commissioner to Tanzania
  1952   – Bob Neill, English lawyer and politician
1953 – William E. Moerner, American chemist and physicist, Nobel Prize laureate
  1953   – Michael Tuck, Australian footballer and coach
1955 – Chris Higgins, English geneticist and academic
  1955   – Edmund Malura, German footballer and manager
  1955   – Loren Roberts, American golfer
1956 – Owen Paterson, English politician, Secretary of State for Northern Ireland
1957 – Mark Parkinson, American lawyer and politician, 45th Governor of Kansas
1958 – Jean Charest, Canadian lawyer and politician, 5th Deputy Prime Minister of Canada
  1958   – Silvio Mondinelli, Italian mountaineer
  1958   – John Tortorella, American ice hockey player and coach
1959 – Andy McCluskey, English singer-songwriter, bass player, and producer 
1960 – Elish Angiolini, Scottish lawyer, judge, and politician, Solicitor General for Scotland
  1960   – Siedah Garrett, American singer-songwriter and pianist
  1960   – Karin Pilsäter, Swedish accountant and politician
  1960   – Erik Poppe, Norwegian director, cinematographer, and screenwriter
1961 – Dennis Danell, American singer and guitarist (d. 2000)
  1961   – Iain Glen, Scottish actor 
  1961   – Bernie Nicholls, Canadian ice hockey player and coach
  1961   – Ralph E. Reed, Jr., American journalist and activist 
  1961   – Curt Smith, English singer-songwriter, guitarist, and producer
1962 – Gautam Adani, Indian industrialist and billionaire
1963 – Yuri Kasparyan, Russian guitarist 
  1963   – Preki, Serbian-American soccer player and coach 
  1963   – Mike Wieringo, American author and illustrator (d. 2007)
1964 – Jean-Luc Delarue, French television host and producer (d. 2012)
  1964   – Kathryn Parminter, Baroness Parminter, English politician
  1964   – Gary Suter, American ice hockey player and scout
1965 – Claude Bourbonnais, Canadian race car driver
  1965   – Uwe Krupp, German ice hockey player and coach
  1965   – Richard Lumsden, English actor, writer, composer and musician
1966 – Hope Sandoval, American singer-songwriter and musician
  1966   – Adrienne Shelly, American actress, director, and screenwriter (d. 2006)
1967 – Janez Lapajne, Slovenian director and producer
  1967   – John Limniatis, Greek-Canadian footballer and manager
1968 – Alaa Abdelnaby, Egyptian-American basketball player and sportscaster
1970 – Glenn Medeiros, American singer-songwriter and guitarist
  1970   – Bernardo Sassetti, Portuguese pianist, composer, and educator (d. 2012)
1972 – Robbie McEwen, Australian cyclist
  1972   – Denis Žvegelj, Slovenian rower
1973 – Alexis Gauthier, French chef
  1973   – Jere Lehtinen, Finnish ice hockey player
1974 – Dan Byles, English sailor, rower, and politician
  1974   – Chris Guccione, American baseball player and umpire
1975 – Marek Malík, Czech ice hockey player
  1975   – Federico Pucciariello, Argentinian-Italian rugby player
1976 – Brock Olivo, American football player and coach
1977 – Dimos Dikoudis, Greek basketball player and manager
  1977   – Jeff Farmer, Australian footballer
1978 – Luis García, Spanish footballer
  1978   – Pantelis Kafes, Greek footballer
  1978   – Shunsuke Nakamura, Japanese footballer
  1978   – Ariel Pink, American singer-songwriter 
  1978   – Juan Román Riquelme, Argentinian footballer
  1978   – Emppu Vuorinen, Finnish guitarist and songwriter
1979 – Mindy Kaling, American actress and producer
  1979   – Petra Němcová, Czech model and philanthropist
1980 – Cicinho, Brazilian footballer
  1980   – Nina Dübbers, German tennis player
  1980   – Andrew Jones, Australian race car driver
  1980   – Minka Kelly, American actress
1982 – Kevin Nolan, English footballer
  1982   – Jarret Stoll, Canadian ice hockey player
1983 – Rebecca Cooke, English swimmer
  1983   – Gianni Munari, Italian footballer
  1983   – Gard Nilssen, Norwegian drummer
  1983   – David Shillington, Australian rugby league player
1984 – Andrea Raggi, Italian footballer
  1984   – JJ Redick, American basketball player
  1984   – Johanna Welin, Swedish-born German wheelchair basketball player
1985 – Diego Alves Carreira, Brazilian footballer
  1985   – Tom Kennedy, English footballer
  1985   – Nate Myles, Australian rugby league player
  1985   – Vernon Philander, South African cricketer
  1985   – Yukina Shirakawa, Japanese model
1986 – Stuart Broad, English cricketer
  1986   – Phil Hughes, American baseball player
  1986   – Solange Knowles, American singer-songwriter and actress
1987 – Simona Dobrá, Czech tennis player
  1987   – Lionel Messi, Argentinian footballer
  1987   – Pierre Vaultier, French snowboarder
1988 – Micah Richards, English footballer
1989 – Teklemariam Medhin, Eritrean runner
1990 – Michael Del Zotto, Canadian ice hockey player
  1990   – Richard Sukuta-Pasu, German footballer
1991 – Yasmin Paige, English actress
  1991   – Aidan Sezer, Australian rugby league player
1992 – David Alaba, Austrian footballer
1996 – Duki, Argentinian rapper
2004 – Erika Andreeva, Russian tennis player

Deaths

Pre-1600
1046 – Jeongjong II, Korean ruler (b. 1018)
1088 – William de Warenne, 1st Earl of Surrey, Norman nobleman
1314 – Gilbert de Clare, 8th Earl of Gloucester, English commander (b. 1291)
  1314   – Robert de Clifford, 1st Baron de Clifford, English soldier and politician, Lord Warden of the Marches (b. 1274)
1398 – Hongwu, Chinese emperor (b. 1328)
1439 – Frederick IV, duke of Austria (b. 1382)
1503 – Reginald Bray, English architect and politician, Chancellor of the Duchy of Lancaster (b. 1440)
1519 – Lucrezia Borgia, Italian wife of Alfonso I d'Este, Duke of Ferrara (b. 1480)
1520 – Hosokawa Sumimoto, Japanese commander (b. 1489)

1601–1900
1604 – Edward de Vere, 17th Earl of Oxford, English courtier, Lord Great Chamberlain (b. 1550)
1637 – Nicolas-Claude Fabri de Peiresc, French astronomer and historian (b. 1580)
1643 – John Hampden, English politician (b. 1595)
1766 – Adrien Maurice de Noailles, French soldier and politician, French Minister of Foreign Affairs (b. 1678)
1778 – Pieter Burman the Younger, Dutch philologist and academic (b. 1714)
1803 – Matthew Thornton, Irish-American judge and politician (b. 1714)
1817 – Thomas McKean, American lawyer and politician, 2nd Governor of Pennsylvania (b. 1734)
1835 – Andreas Vokos Miaoulis, Greek admiral and politician (b. 1769)

1901–present
1902 – George Leake, Australian politician, 2nd Premier of Western Australia (b. 1856)
1908 – Grover Cleveland, American lawyer and politician, 22nd and 24th  President of the United States (b. 1837)
1909 – Sarah Orne Jewett, American novelist, short story writer, and poet (b. 1849)
1922 – Walther Rathenau, German businessman and politician, 7th German Minister for Foreign Affairs (b. 1867)
1923 – Edith Södergran, Swedish-Finnish poet (b. 1892)
1931 – Otto Mears, Russian-American businessman (b. 1840)
  1931   – Xiang Zhongfa, Chinese politician, 2nd General Secretary of the Chinese Communist Party (b. 1880)
1932 – Ernst Põdder, Estonian general (b. 1879)
1943 – Camille Roy, Canadian priest and critic (b. 1870)
1946 – Louise Whitfield Carnegie, American philanthropist (b. 1857)
1947 – Emil Seidel, American politician, Mayor of Milwaukee (b. 1864)
1962 – Volfgangs Dārziņš, Latvian composer, pianist and music critic (b. 1906)
1964 – Stuart Davis, American painter and academic (b. 1892)
1969 – Frank King, American cartoonist (b. 1883)
  1969   – Willy Ley, German-American historian and author (b. 1906) 
1975 – Wendell Ladner, Professional Basketball Player in the ABA 
1976 – Minor White, American photographer, critic, and academic (b. 1908)
1978 – Robert Charroux, French author and critic (b. 1909)
1980 – V. V. Giri, Indian lawyer and politician, 4th President of India (b. 1894)
1984 – Clarence Campbell, Canadian businessman (b. 1905)
1987 – Jackie Gleason, American actor, comedian, and producer (b. 1916)
1988 – Csaba Kesjár, Hungarian race car driver (b. 1962)
1991 – Sumner Locke Elliott, Australian-American author and playwright (b. 1917)
  1991   – Rufino Tamayo, Mexican painter and illustrator (b. 1899)
1994 – Jean Vallerand, Canadian violinist, composer, and conductor (b. 1915)
1995 – Andrew J. Transue, American politician and attorney Morissette v. United States (b. 1903)
1997 – Brian Keith, American actor (b. 1921)
2000 – Vera Atkins, British intelligence officer (b. 1908)
  2000   – David Tomlinson, English actor and comedian (b. 1917)
  2000   – Rodrigo Bueno, Argentine cuarteto singer (b. 1973)
2001 – Konstantin Gerchik, the second head of the world's first cosmodrome — "Baikonur" (1958-1961).
2002 – Pierre Werner, Luxembourgian banker and politician, 21st Prime Minister of Luxembourg (b. 1913)
2004 – Ifigeneia Giannopoulou, Greek songwriter and author (b. 1957)
2005 – Paul Winchell, American actor, voice artist, and ventriloquist (b. 1922)
2007 – Natasja Saad, Danish rapper and reggae singer (b. 1974)
  2007   – Chris Benoit, Canadian wrestler (b. 1967)
  2007   – Derek Dougan, Northern Irish footballer and manager (b. 1938) 
2008 – Gerhard Ringel, Austrian mathematician and academic (b. 1919)
2009 – Roméo LeBlanc, Canadian journalist and politician, 25th Governor General of Canada (b. 1927)
2010 – Fred Anderson, American jazz tenor saxophonist (b. 1929)
2011 – Tomislav Ivić, Croatian football coach and manager (b. 1933)
2012 – Darrel Akerfelds, American baseball player and coach (b. 1962)
  2012   – Gad Beck, German author and educator (b. 1923) 
  2012   – Gu Chaohao, Chinese mathematician and academic (b. 1926)
  2012   – Miki Roqué, Spanish footballer (b. 1988)
  2012   – Ann C. Scales, American lawyer, educator, and activist (b. 1952)
2013 – Mick Aston, English archaeologist and academic (b. 1946)
  2013   – Emilio Colombo, Italian politician, 40th Prime Minister of Italy (b. 1920)
  2013   – Joannes Gijsen, Dutch bishop (b. 1932)
  2013   – William Hathaway, American lawyer and politician (b. 1924)
  2013   – James Martin, English-Bermudian computer scientist and author (b. 1933)
  2013   – Alan Myers, American drummer  (b. 1955)
2014 – John Clement, Canadian lawyer and politician (b. 1928)
  2014   – Olga Kotelko, Canadian runner and softball player (b. 1919)
  2014   – Ramón José Velásquez, Venezuelan journalist, lawyer, and politician, President of Venezuela (b. 1916)
  2014   – Eli Wallach, American actor (b. 1915)
2015 – Cristiano Araújo, Brazilian singer-songwriter (b. 1986)
  2015   – Mario Biaggi, American police officer, politician and criminal (b. 1917)
  2015   – Marva Collins, American author and educator (b. 1936)
  2015   – Susan Ahn Cuddy, American lieutenant (b. 1915)
2021 – Benigno Aquino III, 15th President of the Philippines (b. 1960)
  2021   – Trần Thiện Khiêm, 7th Prime Minister of South Vietnam and army officer (b. 1925)

Holidays and observances
 Army Day or Battle of Carabobo Day (Venezuela)
 Bannockburn Day (Scotland)
 Christian feast day:
 María Guadalupe García Zavala 
 Nativity of Saint John the Baptist
 June 24 (Eastern Orthodox liturgics)
 Day of the Caboclo (Amazonas, Brazil)
Inti Raymi, a winter solstice festival and a New Year in the Andes of the Southern Hemisphere (Sacsayhuamán)
 St John's Day and the second day of the Midsummer celebrations (although this is not the astronomical summer solstice, see June 20) (Roman Catholic Church, Europe), and its related observances: 
 Enyovden (Bulgaria)
 Jaanipäev (Estonia)
 Jāņi (Latvia)
 Jónsmessa (Iceland)
 Midsummer Day (England)
 Saint Jonas' Festival or Joninės (Lithuania)
 Saint-Jean-Baptiste Day (Quebec)
 Sânziene (western Carpathian Mountains of Romania)
 Wattah Wattah Festival (Philippines)
 Fors Fortuna, ancient Roman festival to Fortuna

References

External links

 
 
 

Days of the year
June